Klaus Roloff (born 20 March 1952) is a German rower. He competed in the men's coxless four event at the 1976 Summer Olympics.

References

External links
 

1952 births
Living people
German male rowers
Olympic rowers of West Germany
Rowers at the 1976 Summer Olympics
Rowers from Berlin
World Rowing Championships medalists for Germany
20th-century German people